Harambee was an African-American newspaper published  in the 1960s  by the Los Angeles Black Congress, an umbrella organization for diverse groups which included  the Congress of Racial Equality (CORE), the Freedom Draft Movement, the Afro-American Association, the National Association for the Advancement of Colored People (NAACP), Ron Karenga's US Organization, John Floyd's Black Panther Political Party, and others. It was instrumental in publicizing the Black Panther idea and symbol in Los Angeles, California. It was originally created in August 1966 by Ron Karenga, for the organization US. Karenga then donated the publication to the Black Congress. Its first issue commemorated the anniversary of the 1965 Watts Rebellion. Activist Elaine Brown was a reporter for the newspaper. Editors included Ron Karenga and John Floyd. The name Harambee is Swahili for "Let's Pull Together."

By April 1969, the newspaper had returned to its roots as an exclusive publication of Karenga's US organization.

References

Defunct African-American newspapers
African-American history in Los Angeles
History of journalism
African-American organizations
Newspapers published in Greater Los Angeles
African-American cultural history
Civil rights movement
Black Power
Defunct newspapers published in California